The Mertainen is an iron ore deposit and mine in Lapland, Sweden, Sweden. It is located about 30 km southeast of the town of Kiruna. In December 2016 Luossavaara-Kiirunavaara AB closed the mine for indefinite time. Re-opening the mine remains a possibility according to LKAB executive Magnus Arnkvist.

The ore is chiefly magnetite with small amounts of hematite. The deposit has a few small massive magnetite bodies and a larger volume of low grade ore made up of host-rock intruded by magnetite veins. The host rock is made up of scapolite and biotite-altered Syenite Porphyry. The Syenite Porphyry display magnetite nodules.

Most of the deposit has a low phosphorus grade (0.05%) but in the northeast phosphorus grades are higher (0.2 to 0.9%).

See also 
Swedish iron ore during World War II

References 

Bibliography

Iron mines in Sweden
Norrbotten
Former mines in Sweden
Surface mines in Sweden